The 1921 World Fencing Championships were held in Paris, France.

Medal summary

Men's events

References

1921 in French sport
F
Fencing
World Fencing Championships
1921 in Paris